Thet Naing Soe (born 5 April 1974) is a Burmese politician who currently serves as a House of Nationalities member of parliament for Tanintharyi Region № 2. He is a member of the National League for Democracy.

Early life and education 
Thet Naing Soe was born in Longlone, Tanintharyi Region on 5 April 1974. He graduated with BSc(Zoology) from Mawlamyine University. Previous employment is farmer.

Political career 
He is a member of the National League for Democracy Party, he was elected as an Amyotha Hluttaw MP, winning a majority of 44107 votes and elected representative from Tanintharyi Region № 2
parliamentary constituency.

References

1974 births
Living people
People from Tanintharyi Region
Members of the House of Nationalities
National League for Democracy politicians